After their 1934 match (won +3 =0 -1 by Menchik), reigning Women's World Chess Champion Vera Menchik and Sonja Graf played a second championship match in Semmering in 1937.

This time the match consisted of 16 games. Menchik was again the favourite and once again left no doubt about who was the strongest female player in the world at the time, clinching the match by a convincing nine wins, five draws, and two losses (11½–4½).

Like the 1934 match, this match was arranged by the two players themselves (much like the open title at the time), but approved and recognized by FIDE.

References 

Women's World Chess Championships
1937 in chess